Stuart Leigh Beavon (born 5 May 1984) is an English professional footballer who plays as a forward for Mickleover Sports.

Career

Early career
Born in Reading, Berkshire, Beavon started his career playing Hellenic League football for Ardley United as a 16-year-old when he was transferred to Combined Counties side AFC Wallingford in 2004.

Didcot Town
Beavon, along with a number of his Wallingford teammates, transferred to local rivals Didcot Town for the start of season 2004–05 and it was during his time with the Railwaymen that he began to attract the attention of numerous professional clubs. He scored two goals in Didcot's FA Vase triumph at White Hart Lane against AFC Sudbury in May 2005. He scored 40 goals the following season as Didcot lifted the Hellenic League Premier Division title.

Weymouth
His fine form continued in the Southern League South & West Division and in January 2007 he was signed by Conference Weymouth on a free transfer.

Wycombe Wanderers
Beavon signed for League Two team Wycombe Wanderers on loan until the end of the 2008–09 season on 19 February 2009, with the option of him signing permanently at the end of the season. Wycombe took this option up after their promotion to League One, and Beavon scored his first goal for the club in his first league start as part of a 1–1 away draw with Hartlepool United. He then proceeded to score a further 2 goals making 14 starts and 11 substitute appearances in a season that ultimately ended in relegation for Wycombe.
His contract was extended by for a further year and played a key role in Wycombe's promotion in the 2010–11 season, by supporting top goal-scorer Scott Rendell.

Again his contract was renewed and he was the only player to be offered a two-year deal seeing him through to the end of the 2012–13 season. After a slow start to the season, scoring a hat-trick in the Football League Trophy but none in the league he gathered goalscoring momentum with his first league goal in a 1–0 win over Sheffield United. This was part of a run of four goals in seven games. He then took another month to get his next goal however managed to score three in two against Milton Keynes Dons and Chesterfield. Two goals against Rochdale took him to nine league goals for the season. After another three games without a goal he scored his 10th of the season against Yeovil Town before notching his 11th and 12th in a 5–0 win over Hartlepool United. He eventually finished the season with 21 league goals, putting him fourth in the League One top goalscorers table (despite the fact he played for a side which was relegated).

He scored his final goal for Wycombe Wanderers on 18 August 2012, in a 3–1 victory away at York City.

Preston North End
During the summer, there was much transfer speculation about a possible move to Preston North End for Beavon. When the season began, interest in the striker died down slightly because Wycombe felt their valuation of the player was not being met by Preston's offers. Westley finally succeeded in signing Beavon on 31 August 2012 (transfer deadline day) and Beavon agreed a two-year contract.

He made an instant impact at the club by scoring in his first match for Preston, a 4–1 win over Swindon Town. On 17 December 2013, Beavon extended his contract with Preston for a further twelve months, thus keeping him at the club until the summer of 2015.

Burton Albion
On 30 June 2014, Beavon joined Burton Albion in League Two, initially on a season-long loan, which subsequently became a permanent deal on transfer deadline day.

Coventry City

On 1 January 2017, Beavon joined Coventry City as part of the deal that saw Marvin Sordell go in the other direction. He made his debut for the club a day later and scored Coventry's second goal in a 2–2 draw with Bolton Wanderers. His second goal for the club was an important one as it was the first in a 2–1 win against Wycombe Wanderers in the EFL Trophy Semi Final. This win sent Coventry to their first Wembley final in 30 years. He was released by Coventry following the announcement of their retained list on 9 May 2019.

Wrexham

On 27 July 2018 Beavon joined Wrexham on a season long loan.

Nuneaton Borough & Mickleover Sports
On 12 June 2019, Beavon signed for Nuneaton Borough. On 21 September 2019, he joined Mickleover Sports F.C. on a season-long loan deal. However, on 14 January 2020 it was reported, that he had signed a permanent deal with Mickleover.

Career statistics

Club

Personal life
He is the son of former Reading midfielder Stuart Beavon, and grandson of former Oxford United defender Cyril Beavon.

Honours
Didcot Town
FA Vase: 2004–05

Wycombe Wanderers
League Two promotion: 2010–11 

Burton Albion
League One runner-up: 2015–16
League Two: 2014–15

Coventry City
EFL Trophy: 2016–17

Individual
Burton Albion Player of the Year: 2014–15, 2015–16

References

External links

1984 births
Living people
Sportspeople from Reading, Berkshire
English footballers
Association football forwards
Ardley United F.C. players
Wallingford Town F.C. players
Didcot Town F.C. players
Weymouth F.C. players
Wycombe Wanderers F.C. players
Preston North End F.C. players
Burton Albion F.C. players
Coventry City F.C. players
Wrexham A.F.C. players
Nuneaton Borough F.C. players
Mickleover Sports F.C. players
National League (English football) players
English Football League players
Footballers from Berkshire